"Everywhere I Go" is a song co-written and recorded by American country music artist Phil Vassar.  It was released in September 2009 as the second single from the album Traveling Circus.  The song reached #36 on the Billboard Hot Country Songs chart.  The song was written by Vassar and Jeffrey Steele.

Critical reception
Sam Gazdziak from Engine 145 gave "Everywhere I Go" a thumbs-down, saying that it "sounds so familiar and commonplace that it’s pretty much impossible to stand out in a crowded radio playlist," while Bobby Peacock of Roughstock considered it similar in sound to Vassar's first album and said that it had an "interesting" structure.

Chart performance

References

2009 singles
2009 songs
Phil Vassar songs
Songs written by Jeffrey Steele
Songs written by Phil Vassar
Show Dog-Universal Music singles